Zolotava is a rural locality (a village) in Ilyinskoye Rural Settlement, Kharovsky District, Vologda Oblast, Russia. The population was 185 as of 2002.

Geography 
Zolotava is located 27 km northeast of Kharovsk (the district's administrative centre) by road. Ishenino is the nearest rural locality.

References 

Rural localities in Kharovsky District